Andrew Chi-Chih Yao (born December 24, 1946) is a Chinese computer scientist and computational theorist. He is currently a professor and the dean of Institute for Interdisciplinary Information Sciences (IIIS) at Tsinghua University. Yao used the minimax theorem to prove what is now known as Yao's Principle.

Yao was a naturalized U.S. citizen, and worked for many years in the U.S. In 2015, together with Yang Chen-Ning, he renounced his U.S. citizenship and became an academician of the Chinese Academy of Sciences.

Early life
Yao was born in Shanghai, China. He completed his undergraduate education in physics at the National Taiwan University, before completing a Doctor of Philosophy in physics at Harvard University in 1972, and then a second PhD in computer science from the University of Illinois at Urbana–Champaign in 1975.

Academic career
Yao was an assistant professor at Massachusetts Institute of Technology (1975–1976), assistant professor at Stanford University (1976–1981), and professor at the University of California, Berkeley (1981–1982). From 1982 to 1986, he was a full professor at Stanford University. From 1986 to 2004, Yao was the William and Edna Macaleer Professor of Engineering and Applied Science at Princeton University, where he continued to work on algorithms and complexity. In 2004, Yao became a professor of the Center for Advanced Study, Tsinghua University (CASTU) and the director of the Institute for Theoretical Computer Science (ITCS), Tsinghua University in Beijing. Since 2010, he has served as the Dean of Institute for Interdisciplinary Information Sciences (IIIS) in Tsinghua University. In 2010, he initiated the Conference on Innovations in Theoretical Computer Science (ITCS). Yao is also the Distinguished Professor-at-Large in the Chinese University of Hong Kong.

Awards
In 1996, Yao was awarded the Knuth Prize. Yao also received the Turing Award in 2000, one of the most prestigious awards in computer science, "in recognition of his fundamental contributions to the theory of computation, including the complexity-based theory of pseudorandom number generation, cryptography, and communication complexity". In 2021, Yao received the Kyoto Prize in Advanced Technology.

Yao is a member of U.S. National Academy of Sciences, a fellow of the American Academy of Arts and Sciences, a fellow of the American Association for the Advancement of Science, a fellow of the Association for Computing Machinery, and an academician of Chinese Academy of Sciences. His wife, Frances Yao, is also a theoretical computer scientist.

See also 

 Yao's principle
 Dolev-Yao model
 Important publications in cryptography
 Yao's test
 Yao's Millionaires' Problem
 Yao graph
 Garbled circuit

References

External links 
 Andrew Yao at CASTU
 
 

1946 births
Living people
20th-century American scientists
20th-century Chinese scientists
21st-century American scientists
21st-century Chinese scientists
American computer scientists
American emigrants to China
Chinese computer scientists
Chinese emigrants to the United States
Chinese University of Hong Kong people
Fellows of the Association for Computing Machinery
Harvard Graduate School of Arts and Sciences alumni
International Association for Cryptologic Research fellows
Knuth Prize laureates
Members of Academia Sinica
Members of the Chinese Academy of Sciences
Foreign associates of the National Academy of Sciences
National Taiwan University alumni
Naturalized citizens of the People's Republic of China
Naturalized citizens of the United States
Former United States citizens
Princeton University faculty
Scientists from Shanghai
Stanford University Department of Computer Science faculty
Academic staff of Tsinghua University
Turing Award laureates
Grainger College of Engineering alumni
UC Berkeley College of Engineering faculty
Kyoto laureates in Advanced Technology